Northview can refer to a location in the United States:

 Northview, Michigan
 Northview, Missouri
 Northview High School (disambiguation) (several)